The Serie B 1974–75 was the forty-third tournament of this competition played in Italy since its creation.

Teams
Alessandria, Sambenedettese and Pescara had been promoted from Serie C, while Foggia, Genoa and Verona had been relegated from Serie A.

Final classification

Results

Tie-breakers

Promotion tie-breaker
Played in Terni

Verona promoted to Serie A.

Relegation tie-breaker
Played in Milan

Alessandria relegated to Serie C.

References and sources
Almanacco Illustrato del Calcio - La Storia 1898-2004, Panini Edizioni, Modena, September 2005

Serie B seasons
2
Italy